Janette Husárová and Paola Suárez won in the final 3–6, 6–2, 6–3 against Melissa Mazzotta and Ekaterina Sysoeva.

Seeds
Champion seeds are indicated in bold text while text in italics indicates the round in which those seeds were eliminated.

 Laurence Courtois /  Corina Morariu (quarterfinals)
 Seda Noorlander /  Noëlle van Lottum (semifinals)
 Svetlana Krivencheva /  Pavlina Stoyanova (first round)
 Janette Husárová /  Paola Suárez (champions)

Draw

External links
 1998 Copa Colsanitas Doubles Draw

Copa Colsanitas
1998 WTA Tour